The Cape Sorell Waverider Buoy, also named Captain Fathom by the listeners of ABC Radio, Tasmania during May 2015 to mark the centenary of the Bureau of Meteorology, is a swell-measuring buoy located west of Cape Sorell some  west of Ocean Beach in western Tasmania.

It is unique in that it is one of the few wave-riding swell measuring buoys close to land in the region within the Roaring Forties of the Southern Ocean apart from those in New Zealand.

Originally known as the Strahan Waverider Buoy, it was deployed in January 1998 and had recorded maximum waves of  within the first three months of operation. Earlier CSIRO-funded wave-measuring buoys were installed on the area in the period 1985 to 1993, at Cape Sorell, Cape Grim and Storm Bay. The Storm Bay location concluded in December 1993.
The table and graph of the range of the swells is publicly available on the internet.  This data is sometimes displayed in the boats that conduct cruises across Macquarie Harbour and up Gordon River, as a means of illustrating the strength and intensity of the swells that meet Ocean Beach.

However it is claimed that the buoy broke its moorings on a  swell within the last decade.

However this measurement has been modified due to the buoy's behaviour at the time, and the height is more likely to have been half that measurement.

On 14 May 2011, further high levels were recorded, reaching .

Captured research data into the record that includes this buoy is used to look at climate change.

Notes

External links 
 Current records of the buoy
 Cape Sorell climate history
 Surf forecast reports

Cape Sorell